Nelson was a federal electoral district that was represented in the House of Commons of Canada from 1917 to 1935. It covered northern Manitoba, Canada, a vast wilderness area dotted with small municipalities and First Nations reserves.

The riding was created in 1914 from parts of Dauphin riding. When Nelson was abolished in 1933, its entire area was transferred into the new riding of Churchill.

Members of Parliament

This riding elected the following members of the House of Commons of Canada:

 1917-1921: John Archibald Campbell - Unionist
 1921-1930: Thomas William Bird - Progressive
 1930-1935: Bernard Stitt - Conservative

Election results

See also 

 List of Canadian federal electoral districts
 Past Canadian electoral districts

External links
 

Former federal electoral districts of Manitoba